"Alas Agnes" was the fourth single by Mystery Jets, released in December 2005. It was later released as part of their first album, Making Dens, and was also the band's first UK Top 40 single. It tells the story of unrequited love for a transvestite.

Track listings

7" vinyl (679L115)
 "Alas Agnes" – 3:54
 "Electric Fires"

CD (679L115CD)
 "Alas Agnes" – 4:54
 "The Last Bench" – 4:33

Limited edition 7" vinyl (679L115X)
(This 7" is titled "Eel Pie Bootleg")
 "Alas Agnes (live from the Astoria, May 2005)"
 "Rastamadeus (live on Eel Pie Island)"
 "Lizzie's Lion (live on Eel Pie Island)"

External links
 Mystery Jets official website

2005 singles
Mystery Jets songs
LGBT-related songs
2005 songs